Hernandez v. New York, 500 U.S. 352 (1991), was a decision by the United States Supreme Court, which held that a prosecutor may dismiss jurors who are bilingual in Spanish and English from juries that will consider Spanish-language testimony.

Peremptory challenges are used to remove jurors thought to be undesirable for virtually any reason by either side in a court case. However, in Batson v. Kentucky (1986), the Supreme Court ruled that peremptory challenges may not be used to remove jurors because of their race. In Hernandez, the Supreme Court had to decide whether the peremptory exclusion of two Hispanic jurors was tantamount to exclusion because of race—and therefore violated the Equal Protection Clause of the United States Constitution.The case is recognized as expanding a Batson challenge to a peremptory strike based on a juror's ethnicity.

Procedural history of the case 
Dinosio Hernandez was convicted by a jury of attempted murder on January 30, 1987, in New York Supreme Court. He appealed his conviction, claiming that under the U.S. Supreme Court's recent decision under Batson v. Kentucky, the prosecutor unconstitutionally used peremptory strikes against jury panel members who had Hispanic last names. On appeal, the court found that because the prosecutor had only challenged the three potential jurors with Hispanic surnames. However, the appellate court found the prosecutor has a nondiscriminatory reason for the challenge because the stricken jurors either had a relative prosecuted by the district attorney's office or spoke Spanish and may not accept the translated testimony as final.

Hernandez proceeded with his Batson claim and appealed to the New York Court of Appeals. New York's highest court of appeals agreed with the appellate court that Hernandez made a prima facie case of discrimination. The court did not find that striking a juror based on their language alone was reversible error as it was a "legitimate neutral ground" for the prosecutor to be concerned of the Spanish-speaking jurors fidelity to a translate court record. The majority noted that the trial judge was present during the entirety of the questioning and was satisfied with the prosecutor's actions as the stricken jurors' body-language signaled doubt.

Judge Kaye authored the dissent, criticizing the majority for the diminished protections of Batson for New York and for deciding the case on federal and not state law. Rather than allow Batson's contours be defined over decades of litigation, Kaye argued that deciding the matter on state law would allow clearer protections earlier for New York residents. On the merits, Kaye believed too much deference was provided to the trial court's decision and was concerned that while the prosecutor expressed an interest in removing Spanish-speakers because of the interpreter there was no indication that any non-Latino jurors were asked if they spoke Spanish as well.

The Supreme Court granted a writ of certiorari to determine if a Latino juror struck from jury service because of their Spanish language in a court translated proceeding violated a defendant's Batson protections.

Arguments at the Supreme Court

Amicus curiae 
The Mexican American Legal Defense and Education Fund (MALDEF) filed an amicus curiae on behalf of Hernandez. MALDEF's argument focused on the wide usage of Spanish by Hispanics and the sociolinguistic evidence that supported Hispanics as living in a world where they are constantly required to switch between Spanish and English without the ability to turn off the ability to speak either.  It forecast that Hispanic jurors would become an "endangered species" if they are presumed to be biased, based on a common attribute.

Oral argument 
At oral argument, Hernandez argued that it is a per se Batson violation to discriminate on language. Hernandez believed that every bilingual juror would express the same hesitance that the striked jurors in his case would because of their language ability. The Court was concerned with line drawing issues of potential multiple dialects or languages for a given foreign country and if a prosecutor could ever use a peremptory strike against a bilingual juror.

New York argued that Hernandez's position was against Supreme Court jurisprudence for three main reasons: it uses the juror's answer as proof of a prosecutor's intent to discriminate, it prevents individualized assessment of jurors in favor of group stereotypes, and it would create no ability for prosecutors to excuse certain jurors.

Plurality decision 
Justice Kennedy wrote the plurality opinion. After outlining the facts of the case and procedural history of the case, the Court moved on to the Court's jurisprudence on Batson. It reiterated Batson's three step process: first, a defendant must make a prima facie case of racial discrimination, second, if it is made the burden shifts to the prosecutor to make a race-neutral showing for the strike, and finally the trial judge make a determination if the defendant's claim stands. Even though Hernandez did not make a prima facie showing before the prosecutor presented a race-neutral reasoning, the Court found this did not impact the analysis because it rested with the trial judge's determination.

The Court side-stepped Hernandez's argument on the correlation between Spanish-speaking ability and ethnicity because of the additional factors the prosecutor articulated in his reasoning for striking the two Latino jurors. Kennedy argued that even assuming all bilingual speakers would hesitate it did not fail a race-neutral analysis because it does not show an intent by the prosecutor to remove all bilingual Latinos and a negative impact does not violate race neutrality.

The trial court's decision is afforded a high level of deference under Batson, and the Court assumed that the trial judge took into account the case-specific factors in making the decision to accept the prosecutor's justification: the high concentration of Spanish speakers in the local population, Spanish as the predominant language for many in that region, the ethnic backgrounds of the parties and witnesses, and the prosecutor's swift justification. This level of deference was based on a trial judge's ability to decide credibility questions that cannot be reviewed solely through the record on the appeal. The plurality did not find any reason that the trial judge's decision presented a clear error and was a permissible view under the evidence.

In a closing dicta discussion, the plurality cited linguistic studies noting the complexity of language and bilingual distinctions. It further counseled that excluding bilinguals is unwise and may be unconstitutional under a different set of facts. Specifically, Kennedy outlined that creating a blanket policy regardless of the case's specific facts or for particular ethnic groups in certain communities language could be treated similarly to skin color under Batson. However, this was not that case.

Concurrence 
Justices O'Connor and Scalia concurred in the plurality's judgement. O'Connor agreed with the plurality's deference to the trial court's decision, but believed it went too far in deciding the constitutional question. After outlining the Court's jurisprudence under Batson and Washington v. Davis, O'Connor limited the Equal Protection Clause analysis for racial discrimination to race only. "No matter how closely tied or significantly correlated to race . . . [it] does not implicate the Equal Protection Clause unless it is based on race." O'Connor reasoned that if a trial judge accepted a prosecutor's nonracial explanation, then there was nothing more for an appeals court to decide on a Batson claim.

Dissent 
Justice Stevens dissented and Justice Marshall joined. Under Batson, Stevens argued that a prosecutor who attempts to rebut a prima facie showing of discrimination must do so with "'legitimate reasons' that are 'related to the particular case to be tried.'" Stevens found the Court erred by allowing an illegitimate explanation for the prosecutor's actions that went to the heart of Batson's protections of the Fourteenth Amendment. Further, Stevens found that the prosecutor's justification would disproportionately affect Spanish-speaking jurors, alternatives were available to address the prosecutor's concerns, and his reasoning should be viewed skeptically because he did not use a for cause challenge.

Justice Blackmun dissented in a separate statement agreeing with Justice Stevens' dissent on the prosecutor's insufficient explanation for dispelling an inference of racial animus.

Criticism of the decision 
The decision received immediate attention with a New York Times article that broke down the arguments and the court's reasoning. Law professors were also skeptical of the decision and its implications. Professor Juan Perea argued that the interconnection between race and language is not properly addressed and that the Supreme Court should have found the prosecutor's peremptory strikes not race-neutral. Professor Deborah Ramirez highlighted that this decision could permit bilinguals to systematically be removed from juries and the pervasiveimpact that may have on Latinos. Professor Alfredo Mirandé furthered this research on "bilingualism as an immutable characteristic" under Fourteenth Amendment Equal Protection Doctrine and noted lower courts had expanded the Supreme Court's reasoning to allow peremptory challenges when a juror understands a foreign language when the translation is disputed at trial.

The Supreme Court has not revisited the question of potential discrimination towards bilingual or multilingual jurors since which has created confusion for lower courts. An examination of twenty years after Hernandez v. New York in California courts found the case's reasoning to be "an arbitrary and flawed tool" but California courts were hesitant to rule contrary. This has left open the question of how the Court would rule if non-Latinos who spoke Spanish were allowed to remain in a jury while Spanish speaking Latinos were struck because of their language ability. Professor Mirandé notes that Latinos across the board are hurt, monolingual Spanish speakers are barred because they lack English while bilingual jurors are struck because they know too much Spanish. He continues that instead bilingual Spanish speakers should be wanted by the court to play an important check on court translations. Another commentator has argued the courts should embrace more bilingualism because of the benefits it provides to the legal system as the Hernandez dissent discussed.

Aftermath of the decision 
Five years later, the Supreme Court cited to Hernandez v. New York as outlining the Batson steps and what met the "legitimate reason" standard for a prosecutor to strike a juror. With the Supreme Court limiting the protections of Batson, states may be able to protect them on a state constitutional basis. Today, the case is understood to expand the Equal Protection Clause's protections of an unbiased jury to apply to ethnic origin alongside Batson's protections for race.

In a habeas corpus case, the United States Court of Appeals for the Third Circuit acknowledged the close connection between language and race noting Kennedy remarked how language can lead to discrimination. However, it found language did not meet the same "heightened" or "strict" scrutiny that race and gender under equal protection doctrine. The Third Circuit did outline that Latino jurors could not be struck because of the theoretical use of Spanish and placed a greater burden on trial judges to be "sensitive to the potential use of language-based peremptories for discriminatory purposes."

See also
 List of United States Supreme Court cases, volume 500
 List of United States Supreme Court cases
 Lists of United States Supreme Court cases by volume
 List of United States Supreme Court cases by the Rehnquist Court
Hernandez v. Texas (1954)

Further reading
 
 
 Montoya, M. (2000). Silence and Silencing: Their Centripetal and Centrifugal Forces in Legal Communication, Pedagogy and Discourse. Michigan Journal of Race & Law. Vol 5:847-911.

References

External links
 
 

United States Supreme Court cases
United States Supreme Court cases of the Rehnquist Court
Batson challenge case law
1991 in United States case law